William Ruff (30 January 1883 – 15 February 1928) was a British wrestler. He competed at the 1908 Summer Olympics and the 1912 Summer Olympics.

References

1883 births
1928 deaths
Olympic wrestlers of Great Britain
Wrestlers at the 1908 Summer Olympics
Wrestlers at the 1912 Summer Olympics
British male sport wrestlers
Sportspeople from London